Petchara Chaowarat (Thai: เพชรา เชาวราษฎร์; born 19 January 1943 in Rayong Province, Thailand) is a Thai actress who starred in around 300 films from 1961 to 1979. An icon of the "Golden Age" of Thai cinema, she was known for her round, pool-like eyes and elaborate hairstyles. Petchara was named a National Artist of Thailand in 2018.

Career
Her first film and starring role was in Banthuk Rak Pimchawee ('Love Diary of Pimchawee'), in 1961. She co-starred with popular leading man, Mitr Chaibancha, and they proved to be popular pair, starring together in more than 150 films.

One of their most popular films was 1970's Monrak luk thung (or 'Magical Love of the Countryside'), a musical rhapsodizing Thai rural life.

In 1964, Petchara was named best actress by the Thailand National Film Awards committee for her role in Nok Noi, and received the award from King Bhumibol.

After Mitr Chaibancha's accidental death on the set of Insee tong in 1970, Petchara continued to act in films. She starred in the 1971 musical comedy Ai Tui ('Mr. Tui'), in which she co-starred with Sombat Metanee, who became a popular leading man after Mitr's death. Her last film was Ai Khuntong, which was released in 1979.

Her public appearances have dwindled over the years, attributed to her near blindness, thought to have been caused from her many hours of working in front of the bright lights on film sets.

In 2004, performance artist Michael Shaowanasai co-directed and starred in the film, The Adventure of Iron Pussy, in which he portrayed a transvestite secret agent. The character's hairstyle, clothing and demeanor were based on Petchara. The film was co-directed by Apichatpong Weerasethakul. More Petchara homage came in 2005, with the film Yam Yasothon ('Hello Yasothon'), a musical-comedy directed by comedian-actor Petchtai Wongkamlao that was set in the 1960s and captured much of the colorful spirit of the Mitr-Petchara era.

References

Further reading
 Tupchai, Suchada (2005) Adoring fans remember famous Thai film star Mitr ChiabanchaPattaya Mail.
 Rithdee, Kong (2005) Fallen idols Bangkok Post.
 Fleshman, Erich (2005) A Brief History of Thai Cinema Notes from Hollywood.
 Saenkhum, Tanita (2003)  Remembering Mitr The Nation. 
 Thai Movie Industry News

1943 births
Blind actors
Living people
Petchara Chaowarat
Petchara Chaowarat
Petchara Chaowarat